Mirta de Perales (September 2, 1922 – May 3, 2011), born Mirta Raya Casanova in Rancho Veloz, Las Villas Province, Cuba was a hairdresser, cosmetologist and businesswoman. She owned an eponymous brand, Mirta  de Perales beauty care products.

Death
She died on May 3, 2011.

External links

1922 births
2011 deaths
Cuban businesspeople
Cuban expatriates in the United States
Beauticians
Cuban women in business